Monks Kirby is a village and civil parish in north-eastern Warwickshire, England. The population of the parish is 445. Monks Kirby is located around one mile east of the Fosse Way, around 8 miles north-west of Rugby, seven miles north-east of Coventry and six miles west of Lutterworth. Administratively it forms part of the borough of Rugby.  One of the largest and most important villages in this part of Warwickshire in the Anglo-Saxon and later medieval period, the village continued to be a local administrative centre into the early 20th century. 

The parish boundaries include two important landed estates: Newnham Paddox, seat of the family of the Earls of Denbigh since the 15th century and Newbold Revel, home of the medieval writer Sir Thomas Malory. Monks Kirby is today a small, attractive, wealthy commuter village with many residents working in Coventry, Birmingham, Leicester and London. Monks Kirby is dominated by the church of St Edith, a site of Christian worship since at least the 10th century and which functioned as a Priory in the Middle Ages. Reflecting its medieval aristocratic and ecclesiastical importance, Monks Kirby is the largest historic parish in Warwickshire and St Edith's one of the largest parish churches in the county.

History

Monks Kirby has been inhabited since at least Roman times, with evidence (Roman urns and bricks) found around the Church suggesting either a Roman cemetery or villa on the current Church site.

Anglo-Saxon Period and Norman Conquest
The good soils, strategic location (near the meeting point of the Fosse Way and Watling Street) and size of the parish suggest it was the dominant village in this part of Warwickshire before the Norman Conquest. The pre-Conquest church of Monks Kirby was the mother church for the surrounding area, connected to the important aristocratic estate of Newnham probably at least as far back as the eighth or ninth century. In the 900s the village was on the frontier between the Viking controlled Danelaw and Anglo-Saxon Mercia. Monks Kirby is just on the west (Anglo-Saxon) side of Watling Street, which was the border. The village's name is first recorded, in Latin, as Kirkberia in 1077 (see below); this is a mix of Danish English Kirk (church) and Anglo-Saxon bury meaning a fortified settlement. In time, the name became Kirkeby and then Kirby. 

At the time of the Norman Conquest, the neighbouring estate of Newnham Paddox was owned by Leofwin, nephew of Leofric, Earl of Mercia (husband of Lady Godiva). After the Conquest, the land around Monks Kirby came into the ownership of Geoffrey de la Guerche, a Breton knight who married Aelgifu, Leofwin's daughter. Geoffrey rebuilt the Anglo Saxon church which had "burst asunder", possibly in fighting between Saxons and Normans in the immediate post-Conquest period. Geoffrey endowed the rebuilt church with lands (notably the village of Copston Magna), and gave it as a priory to the Benedictine Abbey of St Nicolas in Anjou in France. 

The Priory was named in honour of the Virgin Mary and St Denis. Unusually, the text of the founding Charter for the Priory survives: The dedication took place on 1 July 1077 and the Charter tells us the names of the first monks – Geoffrey, Ranulf, Stephen, Maurice, Roger and Herman. After Geoffrey's death, his estates, including the lands around Monks Kirby reverted to the King, who subsequently granted them to Nigel d'Aubigny, the father of Roger de Mowbray whose descendants were to become Earls of Nottingham and Dukes of Norfolk.  The Newnham family (who took their name from the estate) are recorded as holding the Newnham Paddox Estate under the Mowbrays from the 1100s.

1100-1500
The twelfth and thirteenth centuries were Monks Kirby's highpoint. The monks produced at least one beautiful illuminated book and many miracles were apparently wrought at the Priory (see Monks Kirby Priory). In 1266 Henry III granted the monks a fair at Midsummer and a weekly market, a result of Monks Kirby's growing importance. The name of one of the village streets, Bond End, reflects the boundary between the feudal tenant farmers ("bondsmen") and the properties of the traders and craftsmen who operated around the Priory Church. 

Through the fourteenth and early fifteenth century the Hundred Years War with France caused major problems for French-led priories like Monks Kirby. Money was short - the priory's estates were intermittently confiscated by the King - and discipline was poor: in  1330 Monks Kirby's Benedictines had needed to be reminded of basic rules such as the non-admission of women to the monastery, and their duty to the poor.  

Having nearly fallen into ruin, the church was substantially rebuilt in around 1380. The basic structure and shape of the church today dates from this reconstruction, as well as one of the church's current eight bells. In 1415 Henry V agreed that the Duke of Norfolk could transfer the priory and its lands out of nominally French hands, to become a house of the Carthusian Abbey established on the Duke's estates at the Isle of Axholme, Lincolnshire. The Carthusians practised a strict monastic lifestyle and the revenues of Monks Kirby Priory provided most of their income but only two priests, and no monks, were maintained at Monks Kirby. The church was again altered in the late fifteenth century, and an octagonal spire was added which must have been an imposing local landmark.

1500-1700
 The Newnham Paddox Estate was held by a number of different families in the fourteenth and early fifteenth century until, on 11 November 1433, John Fildyng, or Feilding bought the estate; he was a descendent of the earlier owners, the Newnham family.  The Feildings expanded their estate by buying parts of the Monks Kirby manor (i.e. the lands that belonged to Monks Kirby priory) from the monks at Axholme in the late 1400s and early 1500s. In the Reformation of the 1540s, King Henry VIII confiscated the assets of the Axholme priory, granting the remaining lands of the Monks Kirby Manor to the Bishop of Ipswich. At the same time he granted the rectory and the advowson of the vicarage and the income from the collection of local tithes to his foundation of Trinity College, Cambridge.

In the 1600s the Feildings' status rose when William Feilding's handsome brother-in-law, George Villiers, became King James I's favourite: Villiers ended up as the immensely powerful Duke of Buckingham. Villiers' friends and family rose with him and William Feilding was made the first Earl of Denbigh. Even William's eight year old second son George (named after his important uncle) was given the right to his own earldom. Meanwhile, the Manor of Monks Kirby had not stayed with the Bishop of Ipswich. There were several owners over the following 80 years before the Manor was bought by the Countess of Buckingham (George Villiers' mother) who passed it to her grandson Basil Feilding, the second Earl of Denbigh.  The Feilding family thus came to own much of Monks Kirby, both the historic Newnham Paddox estate and the lands that in the medieval period had belonged to the Priory Church of Monks Kirby.

1700 to 21st century
The Church's spire blew down in a storm on Christmas Night 1701. The enclosure of farming land in the eighteenth and nineteenth century saw the wealthy land owners of Monks Kirby deprive local people of  their traditional access to common land. The Skipwith family, lords of Newbold Revel in the 1700s, extensively used their position as Members of Parliament to promote enclosure acts on behalf of their own family and friends, including the land at Stretton-under-Fosse.

The most notorious incident in the Monks Kirby enclosure process happened in 1837 when the 7th Earl of Denbigh wanted to rent a large parcel of land, Pailton Pastures, from the other major landowner, Trinity College, Cambridge. This involved clearing the land of its sitting tenants. There were riots by Pailton residents. One particular very elderly tenant, Thomas Gubbins, stood in the way of the Earl and the College's plan. The Earl pursued the case until Gubbins - said to have been over 100 years old - was sent to prison where he soon died.  This was scandalous even at the time: the county newspaper wrote, "We may well wonder what could have been the feelings of a plaintiff [ie the Earl of Denbigh] in a case such as this. Is he now satisfied?" Gubbins became known as the Pailton Martyr.

The vicar of Monks Kirby - appointed by Trinity College, Cambridge - played an eager part in the prosecution of Gubbins. With the Church of England so clearly on the side of the powerful, it is unsurprising that many ordinary Monks Kirby residents turned to nonconformist churches from the 17th to the early 20th century.  Nonconformity in the Parish dated back to the time of Oliver Cromwell and a Baptist congregation was established in 1817, its members initially suffering much persecution. The Baptist chapel was built at the end of Bell Lane, on the edge of the village, just outside the Earl of Denbigh's lands. It had 150 seats and was demolished around 1960.

The 18th and 19th century enclosure process led to the establishment of larger, tenanted farms on the Denbigh, Newbold Revel and Trinity College, Cambridge lands: the distinctive Victorian farm buildings are a major feature of the rural landscape around Monks Kirby. The tenant farmers  formed the dominant rural middle class in Monks Kirby society from the Victorian era to the mid twentieth century. The Monks Kirby Farmers Club Show was the major event of their year with hundreds of cows and horses exhibited and, at its peak in 1914, 7,000 people attending.  Trinity College retains the benefice today (and therefore is still involved in appointing the vicar) but divested itself of substantial landholdings around Monks Kirby following the Second World War. Similarly, The Feilding family have -  since the mid-twentieth century - steadily sold off much of their estate (for example selling 2,500 acres of the historic Newnham Paddox estate in 2014–15).

Parish boundaries
The historic parish boundaries of Monks Kirby, existing from the medieval era through to the nineteenth century included several neighbouring villages and hamlets: Copston Magna, Pailton, Stretton-under-Fosse, Newbold Revel, Brockhurst, Little Walton, Street Ashton and Easenhall.  The Parish had an exclave in Leicestershire, the land known as Goresland in Ullesthorpe, separated from Monks Kirby by the neighbouring parish of Wibtoft and just over the county border. Monks Kirby was the largest parish in Warwickshire; the historic size of Monks Kirby was around 10,000 acres, 15 square miles. Around 1866, Pailton, Easenhall, Stretton-under-Fosse and Copston became separate parishes. Even within its much reduced modern boundaries, Monks Kirby civil parish still has an area of 4550 acres, around 7 square miles, placing it in top 11% of English parishes by area. The ecclesiastical parish no longer includes Copston or Easenhall but still includes Pailton and Stretton-under-Fosse. The (civil and ecclesiastical) boundaries of Monks Kirby still include the lands of the village of Cestersover, abandoned in the Middle Ages.

Local government
Early in the 17th century the hundred of Knightlow (one of the county's four administrative divisions) was reorganised on a basis of four High Constables' divisions – Kenilworth, Monks Kirby, Rugby, and Southam. Monks Kirby retained its high constable until 1828. People living in poverty in Monks Kirby in the 19th century were sent to the workhouse in Lutterworth: from 1834 the civil parish of Monks Kirby was part of Lutterworth Poor Law Union The Lutterworth Rural Sanitary District was introduced in 1875 covering the same area as the Poor Law Union. Rural Sanitary Districts were replaced with Rural Districts and aligned with county borders in 1894: Monks Kirby Rural District existed from 1894 to 1932 covering the Warwickshire parishes that had been in the Lutterworth RSD. In 1932 Monks Kirby Rural District was merged into Rugby Rural District, which in turn merged with Rugby Municipal Borough in 1974, to form today's Rugby Borough Council.

Monks Kirby Today
Monks Kirby's population today is only slightly higher than that recorded in the Domesday book, far lower than the village's population in the nineteenth century and probably the twelfth and thirteenth century too. Since the 1950s the primarily agricultural population of the village has been replaced by a wealthy, well educated older demographic through a process of extended suburbanisation from the many nearby towns and cities. Residents are attracted by the quiet, well kept village, with good road connections. The village is in the Coventry Green Belt. Apart from one village pub, The Denbigh Arms, the village now has no shops or other commercial enterprises. There are two churches: St Edith's Anglican Church and St Joseph's Roman Catholic Church. There is also a well-used village hall and the Revel school. The village has moved significantly since the medieval era and particularly in the last seventy years. While the historic village was centred around the parish church, the centre of the village today is further to the north east: the village has merged with Brockhurst which was a separate hamlet on the other side of the Smite brook.

Roman Catholic Community
Monks Kirby has been a local centre for the Roman Catholic faith since the conversion of Rudolph, the 8th Earl of Denbigh to Catholicism in 1850. St Joseph's convent and girls school/orphanage were established in the village in the 1870s. The first nuns were Sisters of Charity from a convent on the Earl's other estate at Pantasaph in Flintshire, North Wales. The Sisters of Charity were succeeded by the Sisters of Mercy in 1923. During the Second World War, The 10th Earl of Denbigh handed over Newnham Paddox House to another community of nuns: Cannonesses of the Holy Sepulchre. These nuns had evacuated their convent, New Hall in Chelmsford in 1940, due to the threat of bombing. During the war, the Canonesses ran a school for local children. They returned to New Hall in 1945.

The Sisters of Mercy remained at the Monks Kirby convent until 1977. In 1982 the convent was occupied by the first congregation of Mary, Mother of the Church (now called "Mater Ecclesiae") established by Sister Catherine Mulligan as a new convent for mature women looking to enter religious life. In 1998 the Mater Ecclesiae congregation moved to Street Ashton House in the neighbouring hamlet of Street Ashton, where it was based until 2020. The remaining, elderly sisters have now dispersed and Street Ashton House sold, bringing to an end a 150-year tradition of (renewed) monastic life in Monks Kirby.

The nineteenth century convent buildings in the village of Monks Kirby have now been converted to housing but a new church, St Joseph's Church, was built in the 1990s to a design by the architect John Holmes. This church was consecrated by the Archbishop of Birmingham, Bernard Longley, on 11 July 2012, the feast of St Benedict.  St Joseph's continues to be a worshipping community today, with a large congregation gathering on Sundays from the parish which spreads beyond the small village of Monks Kirby. There is also a daily Mass in the parish. Planning permission has been granted for a small church hall, to be built on land to the rear of the Church. Highlights during the year include the Annual May Procession when the parish process in honour of Our Lady ending with the crowning of the statue and Benediction of the Blessed Sacrament. There is also a Corpus Christi procession in June from the Village Green to St Joseph's. In July 2018 St Joseph's fitted a new bell system which allows the Angelus to be rung at 12 noon and 6pm as well as calling the faithful to Mass. At special times of the year and at the end of the school day Hymns are played on the automated carillon.

The present parish priest is a priest of the Ordinariate of Our Lady of Walsingham and the Parish is formally in the care of the Ordinariate. The Ordinariate Use of the Mass (Divine Worship) is celebrated weekly and St Joseph's has become a focus for members of the Ordinariate from the Leicestershire and East Warwickshire area. Evensong and Benediction are celebrated. On the outskirts of Monks Kirby is a Roman Catholic burial site, originally a private graveyard for the Feilding family but which today is used for burials from St Joseph's. The Chapel of the Sacred Heart at the burial ground was designed by the architect Thomas Henry Wyatt as part of the remodelling of Newnham Paddox House, undertaken for the eighth earl in 1888.

The Revel School
Children from Monks Kirby and surrounding villages attend the Revel School, which is possibly unique in that it is a Church of England school with Roman Catholic provision and Catechesis. Children from the school regularly visit the Catholic Church for worship and are prepared through the school for their First Holy Communion. Both the Church of England Rector and Catholic Parish Priest lead worship in the school. School Masses (within St Joseph's) take place regularly.

Newnham Paddox

The Newnham Paddox estate neighbours Monks Kirby and is the seat of the Earl of Denbigh. Much of the estate has been sold in recent decades. The estate was very ancient, probably dating from the post-Roman, Anglo-Saxon invasion period when new settlements were established (hence New-ham). A very large manor house existed on the estate until 1952, which had at least three stages of development:
 There  was a large, probably timber-framed house (with 34 hearths) built in the late 16th or early 17th century. In the late 1600s, grand formal gardens were laid out with an immense series of pools (known as the "Great Canal") running behind and alongside the house. These can be seen in an engraving produced in 1707.

 In 1754-68 Lancelot "Capability" Brown built a large mansion house for the fifth and sixth Earls (perhaps incorporating elements of the earlier house). At the same time, Brown removed the formal gardens replacing them with landscaped garden in his distinctive style.
 In the late 19th century, the house was substantially redeveloped in the French style including an ornate Roman Catholic chapel, by the architect Thomas Henry Wyatt. This nineteenth century house was of little architectural interest. It was demolished in 1952 after receiving water damage resulting from the thawing of frozen pipes at a time when the family was hit by heavy death duties.

There is very little information on the Capability Brown house. However, in 2020, archaeologists discovered that, "The former manor designed by Capability Brown at Newnham Paddox was still extant just below the turf level." A full excavation of the site was scheduled to begin in the same year. The grand gates, stables and Brown's landscaped gardens remain and the current Earl still lives in a twentieth century, wooden house in the grounds. The grounds of the house are opened at least annually (though not in 2020 or 2021 due to Covid ) for a popular springtime "Daffodil Sunday" event when thousands of daffodils come in to flower across the grounds.  
.

Notes

References

Sources

Warwickshire Towns & Villages, by Geoff Allen (2000)

External links

Monks Kirby Website
Monks Kirby Parish Council Website

Villages in Warwickshire